Creek Stand (also Creekstand) is an unincorporated community in Macon County, Alabama, United States.

History
The community is named due to it being founded on the former site of a Creek Indian village. A post office operated under the name Creek Stand from 1850 to 1921.

Creek Stand is located along the route of the Federal Road. A tavern was located in Creek Stand that was operated by Tustunnuggee Hopoie (Little Prince), who was the headman of Coweta and a Speaker for the Lower Creek.

The Creek Stand A.M.E. Zion Church was founded in 1895 and the adjacent cemetery was listed on the National Register of Historic Places in 2016. The cemetery contains several graves of people who were involved in the Tuskegee Syphilis Study.

Gallery

References

Unincorporated communities in Macon County, Alabama
Unincorporated communities in Alabama
Columbus metropolitan area, Georgia
1850 establishments in Alabama
Alabama placenames of Native American origin